Caleb Walton West (May 25, 1844 – January 25, 1909) was an American politician.

Born in Cynthiana in Harrison County, Kentucky, West was a Confederate veteran and a municipal judge in Kentucky. He was Governor of Utah Territory twice, between 1886 and 1888 and between 1893 and 1896, the last before statehood.

References 

 
 
 

1844 births
1909 deaths
People from Cynthiana, Kentucky
People of Kentucky in the American Civil War
Governors of Utah Territory
Kentucky state court judges
19th-century American judges